Nitin Govardhan Ghule (Marathi:नितीन घुले) (born 20 May 1986) is an Indian Kabaddi Player. He is a gold medalist in the Guangzhou Asian Games, 2010. He started to play with Adinath Sports club, Bopkhel, Pune since childhood. He was a part of team in various national, international competitions including Asian beach kabaddi Games in 2008.

See also
 Kabaddi at the 2010 Asian Games
 Beach kabaddi at the 2008 Asian Beach Games

References

External links
 DNA, 15 November 2010
 Pudhari Newspaper, 27 November 2010
 Pudhari Newspaper, 27 November 2010
 Lokmat, Pune Edition, 1 December 2010
 Sakal, Pune, 1 December 2010

Living people
Asian Games medalists in kabaddi
Marathi people
Indian kabaddi players
1986 births
Kabaddi players at the 2010 Asian Games
Kabaddi players from Pune
Asian Games gold medalists for India
Medalists at the 2010 Asian Games